Café Elektric (1927) is an Austrian film directed by Gustav Ucicky.

Plot 
Erni (Marlene Dietrich), the daughter of a wealthy industrialist Göttlinger (Fritz Alberti) falls for a pickpocket Fredl (Willi Forst), but Fredl prefers Hansi (Nina Vanna), a prostitute at the Café Elektric. Max (Igo Sym) who is a Göttlinger architect, loves Erni, until he discovers her relationship with Fredl. Recuperating at the Café Elektric, Max falls in love with Hansi. Göttlinger also liked Hansi, so he fired Max. Max now lives in need with reformed Hansi, but leaves her when he suspects she has returned to prostitution. At the Café Elektric Fredl stabs Hansi. Max now is a reporter who covers the story. Since Hansi is innocent, they reunite.

Cast 
 Willi Forst as Fredl
 Marlene Dietrich as Erni Göttlinger
 Fritz Alberti as Kommerzialrat Göttlinger
 Anny Coty as Göttlingers Freundin
 Igo Sym as Max Stöger, Göttlinger's architect
 Vera Salvotti as Paula
 Nina Vanna as Hansi
 Dolly Davis
 Albert Kersten as Herr. Zerner

References

External links 
 

1927 films
Austrian silent feature films
Austrian black-and-white films
Films directed by Gustav Ucicky